Alfred Keller  (1902–1955) was a museum artist who created large models of insects and other small animals; these models are unique for their impressive attention to detail.

Keller was employed at the Museum für Naturkunde (Museum of Natural History) in Berlin, Germany from 1930 until his death in 1955, and his sculptures can still be found there. He worked with papier-mâché and several other materials such as celluloid and galalith to create models of insects including a flea (1930, 100:1 scale), a housefly (1932, 50:1 scale), a mosquito in flight (1937, 60:1 scale), a Colorado potato beetle (1940, 50:1 scale), and a ball bearer leafhopper (Bocydium globulare, 1953, 180:1 scale), among others. The housefly, typical of the painstaking attention to detail shown in Keller's sculptures, includes 2,653 bristles. Each model took about a year to complete.

Works

References

External links
German webpage including a photo of two of Keller's insect sculptures.
Nature article about Alfred Keller (subscription required)
Blog post containing a photograph of Keller's ball bearer leafhopper

Artists from Berlin
20th-century German sculptors
20th-century German male artists
German male sculptors
1902 births
1955 deaths